Kurt Elshot (born 3 July 1977) is a Dutch former professional footballer. He usually played as a defender in a right back position. He has formerly played for FC Groningen and NAC Breda.

Club career

Youth
Elshot was born in Paramaribo, Suriname. As a youth, he moved to Geleen, a town in Limburg, the Netherlands. At age six, he moved to Groningen in the northern part of the country, and this was also where he started his footballing career, at local amateur side SC Gronitas. Some years later, he moved to GVAV-Rapiditas, an amateur club known as one of FC Groningen's feeder clubs. He was therefore brought to FC Groningen in 1995, and was introduced to the first team a year later.

Professional
On 31 March 1996, Elshot made his Eredivisie debut in an away match against FC Utrecht where he replaced Mathias Florén as a substitute in the 70th minute. Elshot would go on to appear in 243 league matches for Groningen, in which he scored 4 goals. On 22 March 2005, Elshot signed a five-year contract with NAC Breda, which would keep him at the club until 2010. He was released from the club in 2010, following financial troubles at the club.

On 2 August 2010, Elshot won the prize for "Most Fashionable Footballer 2010", hosted by Esquire, for the footballer in the Dutch Eredivisie with the best fashion style.

Fashion career
After retiring as a player, Elshot became a fashion designer.

Statistics

References

External links
 Official website

1977 births
Living people
Sportspeople from Paramaribo
Dutch footballers
Surinamese emigrants to the Netherlands
Association football fullbacks
FC Groningen players
NAC Breda players
Eredivisie players
Eerste Divisie players
Dutch fashion designers
GVAV players